is a leading Canadian contract law case, concerning good faith as a basic organizing principle in contractual relations in Canada's common law jurisdictions.

The case at hand
Canadian American Financial Corp (now known as Heritage Education Funds) marketed Registered Education Saving Plans, and hired Bhasin as an "enrollment director" in 1998 for three years with automatic renewal unless six months' notice was given. Hrynew, another enrollment director who competed, had proposed to merge their agencies, and asked Can-Am to force it, but Bhasin refused. Then, Can-Am appointed Hrynew as a "provincial trading officer" to review compliance with the Alberta Securities Commission's regulations, which meant auditing enrollment directors, with the power to review confidential business records. Bhasin objected. In June 2000, Can-Am told the Commission it would restructure its agencies to comply and this involved Bhasin working for Hrynew's agency, but nothing was said to Bhasin. Bhasin was told that Hrynew was obliged to treat information confidentially, and was evasive when Bhasin asked in August 2000 if the merger was a "done deal." Bhasin then refused to allow Hrynew to audit his records. Can-Am threatened to terminate his post, and in May 2001 gave notice of non-renewal. When the term expired, Bhasin lost the value of his business and workforce, while his sales agents were poached by Hrynew. Bhasin claimed that there was a breach of the implied term of good faith.

The courts below
At the Court of Queen's Bench of Alberta, Moen J found that it was an implied term of the contract that decisions about whether to renew the contract would be made in good faith.  The court held that the corporate respondent was in breach of the implied term of good faith, Hrynew had intentionally induced breach of contract, and the respondents were liable for civil conspiracy. He found that Can-Am acted dishonestly with Bhasin throughout the events leading up to the non-renewal: it misled him about its intentions with respect to the merger and about the fact that it had already proposed the new structure to the commission; it did not communicate to him that the decision was already made and final, even though he asked; and it did not communicate with him that it was working closely with Hrynew to bring about a new corporate structure with Hrynew's being the main agency in Alberta. The trial judge also found that, had Can-Am acted honestly, Bhasin could have "governed himself accordingly so as to retain the value in his agency."

The Alberta Court of Appeal later allowed the respondents' appeal and dismissed Bhasin's lawsuit, finding his pleadings to be insufficient and holding that the lower court erred by implying a term of good faith in the context of an unambiguous contract containing an entire agreement clause.

Bhasin appealed to the Supreme Court of Canada.

Judgment of the SCC

The appeal against Can-Am was allowed, while the one against Hrynew was dismissed. The trial judge's assessment of damages in the amount of $381,000 was varied, being reduced to $87,000.

Cromwell J, in a unanimous decision of the SCC, held that Can-Am was liable for breach of the duty of good faith by misleading Bhasin in the period leading up to exercising the non-renewal clause, both regarding its own intentions and Hrynew's role as the PTO. This negated honest performance. Can-Am was held liable for damages based on the position Bhasin would have been in if Can-Am had fulfilled its duty, assessing damages at $87,000. However Hrynew was not liable, as the Court of Appeal had held, because the requirements of inducing breach of contract and civil conspiracy were not made out.

Good faith contractual performance is a general organising principle of contract law, which states a general requirement of justice. It can be given different weight in different situations, but ensures the law is developed in a coherent and principled way. As a sub-category of good faith, there is a duty to act honestly in the performance of contractual obligations, not capriciously and arbitrarily. This accords with the reasonable expectations of commercial parties. A contracting party must have 'appropriate regard' for the other party's legitimate interests, depending on the context and primarily means not undermining those interests in bad faith. This differs to higher fiduciary obligations because it does not require loyalty or putting the other contractual party first. The doctrine is to be developed incrementally with analogy to existing areas where good faith is recognised, but the existing categories are not closed. The principle should be consistent with the weight the common law places on freedom of contracting parties to pursue self-interest: motives of contracting parties should not be scrutinised. However, good faith (like good conscience in equity) operates irrespective of the intentions of the parties and limits freedom of contract, albeit that in some contexts parties should be free to relax the requirements.

Impact

The Court's decision was greatly anticipated, and its impact was recognized immediately. It was agreed that further litigation will be required with respect to the scope and implications of the general organizing principle of good faith and the specific duty of honest contractual performance. In the meantime, there will be practical implications, including more precision in contract drafting, greater care in the exercise of contractual rights, and more diligent communication between parties. The Court did not address the existence of a duty to negotiate in good faith, but the existence of a duty of honest contractual performance will certainly influence the conduct of future negotiations. There has also been debate as to how this will reconcile with the doctrine of utmost good faith, especially with respect to the manner in which termination clauses operate in the area of insurance contracts.

There is general agreement on several points arising from the case:

It applies only in the context of the performance of contractual obligations, and not to the negotiation of the contracts themselves.
The general organizing principle of good faith must be applied according to the context of the contract in question.
The duty of honest performance does not equate to a duty of fiduciary loyalty.
The duty of honest performance does not equate to a duty of disclosure.
While the court did not rule out the ability of contracting parties to influence the scope of honest performance in a particular context, it did state that a generically worded entire agreement clause would not constitute an indication of the parties' intentions in that regard.

The concept of dealing in good faith already exists under the Civil Code of Quebec, and is seen as being the norm in the United States under its Uniform Commercial Code and other decisions of its state courts.

The decision is also seen as building on earlier common law jurisprudence, and being in line with developing English case law (although there is debate as to that nature and scope).

Further reading

See also

Canadian contract law
 English contract law

Notes

References

Canadian contract case law
Supreme Court of Canada cases
2014 in Canadian case law